Mackel is a surname. Notable people with the surname include:

Billy Mackel (1912–1986), American jazz guitarist
Ciarán Mackel (born 1955), Northern Irish architect
Kathy Mackel (born 1950), American author and screenwriter

See also
Macke
Mackell
Macken (surname)